is the 25th single by Japanese band Dir En Grey, released on December 2, 2009 in Japan in a regular and limited edition, the limited copy featuring a bonus DVD. It also appears remastered as the twelfth track on Dum Spiro Spero.

The first B-side, "Zan", is a re-recording of a track from band's first album, Gauze. The second B-side, "Shokubeni (Shot In One Take)" is a re-recording of a track from the band's fourth album, Vulgar, recorded in one take live in the studio.

The single is included in the Saw 3D movie soundtrack along with fellow Japanese artists Boom Boom Satellites and Wagdug Futuristic Unity. The song was also featured as downloadable content for the video game Rock Band 3 through the Rock Band Network 2.0 catalog.

Track listing

CD

DVD

Chart position

References

2009 singles
Dir En Grey songs
Songs written by Kyo (musician)
2009 songs